VHS Medical Center Station is a terminal railway station on Seoul Subway Line 9 in Gangdong-gu, Seoul. It became the line's southern terminus on December 1, 2018, when phase 3 was completed. The word VHS stands for "Veterans Health Service".

References

Seoul Metropolitan Subway stations
Metro stations in Gangdong District
Railway stations opened in 2018
Seoul Subway Line 9